The Davy Medal is awarded by the Royal Society of London "for an outstandingly important recent discovery in any branch of chemistry". Named after Humphry Davy, the medal is awarded with a monetary gift, initially of £1000 (currently £2000). Receiving the Davy Medal has been identified as a potential precursor to being awarded the Nobel Prize in Chemistry, with 22 scientists as of 2022 having been awarded the medal prior to becoming Nobel laureates, according to an analysis by the Royal Society of Chemistry.

History
The medal was first awarded in 1877 to Robert Wilhelm Bunsen and Gustav Robert Kirchhoff "for their researches & discoveries in spectrum analysis", and has since been awarded 140 times. The medal is awarded annually and, unlike other Royal Society medals (such as the Hughes), has been awarded without interruption since its inception.

The medal has been awarded to multiple individuals in the same year: in 1882, for example, it was awarded to Dmitri Mendeleev and Julius Lothar Meyer "for their discovery of the periodic relations of the atomic weights"; in 1883 to Marcellin Berthelot and Julius Thomsen "for their researches in thermo-chemistry"; in 1893 to Jacobus Henricus van 't Hoff and Joseph Achille Le Bel "In recognition of their introduction of the theory of asymmetric carbon, and its use in explaining the constitution of optically active carbon compounds"; in 1903 to Pierre Curie and Marie Curie "for their researches on radium" and in 1968 to John Cornforth and  "in recognition of their distinguished joint work on the elucidation of the biosynthetic pathway to polyisoprenoids and steroids".

List of recipients
Source: Royal Society

See also

 List of chemistry awards

References
General

Specific

External links
 Royal Society official website

1877 introductions
1877 establishments in the United Kingdom
Chemistry awards
1877 in science
Awards of the Royal Society
Awards established in 1877